Baeza may refer to:

 Baeza, Ecuador
 Baeza, Spain
 University of Baeza
 Baeza Cathedral
 Brusqeulia baeza, a species of moth

People
 Baeza (rapper) (born 1993), American rapper, singer, actor, hip hop producer, and songwriter
 Acario Cotapos Baeza (1889–1969), Chilean composer
 Alberto Baeza (born 1938), Mexican football player
 Alberto Baeza Flores (1914–1998), Chilean poet, writer, and journalist
 Alberto Campo Baeza (born 1946), Spanish architect
 Braulio Baeza (born 1940), American jockey
 Braulio Baeza (footballer) (born 1990)
 Claudio Baeza (born 1993), Chilean football player
 Ezequiel Baeza (born 1944), Chilean long-distance runner
 Fernando Baeza Meléndez (born 1942), Mexican politician
 Francisco Martínez de Baeza, colonial governor of New Mexico
 Frutos Baeza (1861–1918), Spanish poet and writer
 Gaspar de Baeza (1540–1569), Spanish humanist, lawyer, translator and writer
 Héctor González Baeza (born 1986), Spanish road racing cyclist
 Jaime Baeza (born 1958), Chilean football player
 Jean Baeza (1942–2011), French football player
 José Delicado Baeza (1927–2014), Roman Catholic archbishop
 José Eusebio Barros Baeza (1810–1881), Chilean lawyer and politician
 José Reyes Baeza Terrazas (born 1961), Mexican politician and lawyer
 Lautaro Baeza (born 1990), Argentinian football player
 Mario Baeza (born 1951), Cuban-American corporate lawyer
 Mario Fernández Baeza (born 1947), Chilean lawyer, professor and politician
 Marta Baeza (born 1992), Brazilian fencer
 Miguel Baeza (fighter), American mixed martial artist
 Miguel Baeza (footballer) (born 2000), Spanish football player
 Nicolás Baeza (born 1997), Chilean football player
 Olegario Lazo Baeza (1878–1964), Chilean writer
 Pablo Baeza (born 1988), Chilean handball player
 Paloma Baeza (born 1975), British actress and director
 Ricardo Baeza Rodríguez, Chilean mathematician
 Ricardo Baeza-Yates (born 1961), Chilean computer scientist
 Virginia Baeza Estrella (born 1965), Mexican politician

See also